Arif Abd ar-Razzaq or Aref Abdel Razzak (1921 – 30 March 2007) was Prime Minister of Iraq for 11 days in September 1965. On September 17 he fled to Egypt, after participating in a failed coup d'état against President Abdul Salam Arif. On 12 June 1966 he led another unsuccessful attempt to overthrow the new government of Premier Abd ar-Rahman al-Bazzaz and President Abdul Rahman Arif.

The Man of Coups in Iraq
He participated in most of the coups which occurred in Iraq during his military service:
 The 14th of July 1958 coup Although he was the pilot of the royal family at that time.
 Ramadan Revolution 1963
 November 1963 Iraqi coup d'état. From November 1963 until March 1964 he was Minister of Agriculture for Iraq. From March 1964 until July 1965 he was Commander of the Air Forces.
 Arif Abd ar-Razzaq first coup 1965
 Arif Abd ar-Razzaq second coup 1966 which was foiled in Mosul by Khaleel Jassim and Kareem Shindana.

References

1921 births
2007 deaths
Arab Nationalist Movement
Iraqi Arab nationalists
Nasserists
Prime Ministers of Iraq